The Cedar Guard Station No. 1019 in the Rogue River – Siskiyou National Forest, near Cave Junction, Oregon, was built in 1933 by the Civilian Conservation Corps.  It was listed on the National Register of Historic Places in 1986 for its architecture.  It was designed by Forest Service architects in rustic style.  The listing included two contributing buildings, a single dwelling and a garage, on a  area.

It is a one-story wood-frame building on a cobblestone foundation, with a centered chimney.  Per its NRHP nomination, the exterior walls were of cedar bark, "with verges and eaves boxed by quarter-round cedar logs, bark on."

See also
National Register of Historic Places listings in Josephine County, Oregon

References

United States Forest Service ranger stations
Civilian Conservation Corps in Oregon
Park buildings and structures on the National Register of Historic Places in Oregon
Government buildings completed in 1933
Buildings and structures in Josephine County, Oregon
Rustic architecture
Rogue River-Siskiyou National Forest
National Register of Historic Places in Josephine County, Oregon
1933 establishments in Oregon